Xanthorhoe orophyla is a moth of the family Geometridae. It is endemic to New Zealand and is found in the South Island in alpine habitat. This species has one brood a year and their larvae feed on cruciferous plants. Adults are on the wing from December to February and are attracted to light.

Taxonomy
This species was first described by Edward Meyrick in 1883 under the name Epyaxa orophylla in a published abstract. Meyrick gave a fuller description of the species in 1884 under the name Epyaxa orophyla. In 1898 George Hudson discussed the species under the name orophyla when placing it within the genus Xanthorhoe. Meyrick again discussed the species in 1917 under the name orophyla when agreeing with its placement in the genus Xanthorhoe. In 1928 Hudson, in his seminal work The butterflies and moths of New Zealand, discussed and illustrated this species again spelling the specific epithet orophyla. In 1988 J. S. Dugdale discussed this species under the epithet orophylla. However, in 2010 the New Zealand Inventory of Biodiversity referred to the species by the epithet orophyla and this spelling has also been followed by the New Zealand Organisms Register. The male lectotype, collected at Lake Wakatipu, is held at the Natural History Museum, London.

Description
In 1898 George Hudson described the species as follows:

Distribution and habitat 
X. orophyla can be found in the high country of the South Island and has been collected in Nelson, Canterbury, and Otago. 
They prefer open areas in lowland to alpine habitat.

Behaviour and life cycle
This species has one brood a year. Adults are on the wing from December to February. The moths are attracted to light. This species is said to be common on Aoraki / Mount Cook's lower slopes.

Host species
Larvae of this species feed on cruciferous plants.

References 

Xanthorhoe
Moths of New Zealand
Moths described in 1883
Endemic fauna of New Zealand
Taxa named by Edward Meyrick
Endemic moths of New Zealand